"The Grass Is Green" is a song recorded by Canadian singer-songwriter Nelly Furtado for her second studio album, Folklore (2003). It was written by Furtado with the song's producer Mike Elizondo. Despite not being released as a single anywhere else than Germany, where it peaked at number sixty-five, the song has been separately praised as noteworthy.

Track listing
CD single

International single

Charts

References

2005 singles
Nelly Furtado songs
Songs written by Mike Elizondo
Songs written by Nelly Furtado
Song recordings produced by Mike Elizondo
2003 songs
Universal Music Group singles